The Ediacaran (formerly Vendian) biota is a taxonomic period classification that consists of all life forms that were present on Earth during the Ediacaran Period. These were composed of enigmatic tubular and frond-shaped, mostly sessile, organisms. Trace fossils of these organisms have been found worldwide, and represent the earliest known complex multicellular organisms. The term "Ediacara biota" has received criticism from some scientists due to its alleged inconsistency, arbitrary exclusion of certain fossils, and inability to be precisely defined.

The Ediacaran biota may have undergone evolutionary radiation in a proposed event called the Avalon explosion, . This was after the Earth had thawed from the Cryogenian period's extensive glaciation. This biota largely disappeared with the rapid increase in biodiversity known as the Cambrian explosion. Most of the currently existing body plans of animals first appeared in the fossil record of the Cambrian rather than the Ediacaran. For macroorganisms, the Cambrian biota appears to have almost completely replaced the organisms that dominated the Ediacaran fossil record, although relationships are still a matter of debate.

A diverse Ediacaran community was discovered in 1995 in Sonora, Mexico, and is approximately 555 million years in age, roughly coeval with Ediacaran fossils of the Ediacara Hills in South Australia and the White Sea on the coast of Russia. While rare fossils that may represent survivors have been found as late as the Middle Cambrian (510 to 500 million years ago), the earlier fossil communities disappear from the record at the end of the Ediacaran leaving only curious fragments of once-thriving ecosystems. Multiple hypotheses exist to explain the disappearance of this biota, including preservation bias, a changing environment, the advent of predators and competition from other life-forms. A sampling, reported in 2018, of late Ediacaran strata across Baltica  suggests the flourishing of the organisms coincided with conditions of low overall productivity with a very high percentage produced by bacteria, which may have led to high concentrations of dissolved organic material in the oceans.

Determining where Ediacaran organisms fit in the tree of life has proven challenging; it is not even established that most of them were animals, with suggestions that they were lichens (fungus-alga symbionts), algae, protists known as foraminifera, fungi or microbial colonies, or hypothetical intermediates between plants and animals. The morphology and habit of some taxa (e.g. Funisia dorothea) suggest relationships to Porifera or Cnidaria (e.g. Auroralumina). Kimberella may show a similarity to molluscs, and other organisms have been thought to possess bilateral symmetry, although this is controversial. Most macroscopic fossils are morphologically distinct from later life-forms: they resemble discs, tubes, mud-filled bags or quilted mattresses. Due to the difficulty of deducing evolutionary relationships among these organisms, some palaeontologists have suggested that these represent completely extinct lineages that do not resemble any living organism. Palaeontologist Adolf Seilacher proposed a separate subkingdom level category Vendozoa (now renamed Vendobionta) in the Linnaean hierarchy for the Ediacaran biota. If these enigmatic organisms left no descendants, their strange forms might be seen as  a "failed experiment" in multicellular life, with later multicellular life evolving independently from unrelated single-celled organisms. A 2018 study confirmed that one of the period's most-prominent and iconic fossils, Dickinsonia, included cholesterol, suggesting affinities to animals, fungi, or red algae.

History

The first Ediacaran fossils discovered were the disc-shaped Aspidella terranovica in 1868. Their discoverer, Scottish geologist Alexander Murray, found them useful aids for correlating the age of rocks around Newfoundland. However, since they lay below the "Primordial Strata" of the Cambrian that was then thought to contain the very first signs of animal life, a proposal four years after their discovery by Elkanah Billings that these simple forms represented fauna was dismissed by his peers. Instead, they were interpreted as gas escape structures or inorganic concretions. No similar structures elsewhere in the world were then known and the one-sided debate soon fell into obscurity. In 1933, Georg Gürich discovered specimens in Namibia but the firm belief that complex life originated in the Cambrian led to them being assigned to the Cambrian Period and no link to Aspidella was made. In 1946, Reg Sprigg noticed "jellyfishes" in the Ediacara Hills of Australia's Flinders Ranges but these rocks were believed to be Early Cambrian so, while the discovery sparked some interest, little serious attention was garnered.

It was not until the British discovery of the iconic Charnia that the Precambrian was seriously considered as containing life. This frond-shaped fossil was found in England's Charnwood Forest first by a 15 year-old girl in 1956 (Tina Negus, who was not believed) and then the next year by a group of three schoolboys including 15 year-old Roger Mason. Due to the detailed geological mapping of the British Geological Survey, there was no doubt these fossils sat in Precambrian rocks. Palaeontologist Martin Glaessner finally, in 1959, made the connection between this and the earlier finds and with a combination of improved dating of existing specimens and an injection of vigour into the search many more instances were recognised.

All specimens discovered until 1967 were in coarse-grained sandstone that prevented preservation of fine details, making interpretation difficult. S.B. Misra's discovery of fossiliferous ash-beds at the Mistaken Point assemblage in Newfoundland changed all this as the delicate detail preserved by the fine ash allowed the description of features that were previously undiscernible. It was also the first discovery of Ediacarans in deep water sediments.

Poor communication, combined with the difficulty in correlating globally distinct formations, led to a plethora of different names for the biota.
In 1960 the French name "Ediacarien" – after the Ediacara Hills – was added to the competing terms "Sinian" and "Vendian" for terminal-Precambrian rocks, and these names were also applied to the life-forms. "Ediacaran" and "Ediacarian" were subsequently applied to the epoch or period of geological time and its corresponding rocks. In March 2004, the International Union of Geological Sciences ended the inconsistency by formally naming the terminal period of the Neoproterozoic after the Australian locality.

The term "Ediacaran biota" and similar ("Ediacara" / "Ediacaran" / "Ediacarian" / "Vendian" and "fauna" / "biota") has, at various times, been used in a geographic, stratigraphic, taphonomic, or biological sense, with the latter the most common in modern literature.

Preservation

Microbial mats

Microbial mats are areas of sediment stabilised by the presence of colonies of microbes that secrete sticky fluids or otherwise bind the sediment particles. They appear to migrate upwards when covered by a thin layer of sediment but this is an illusion caused by the colony's growth; individuals do not, themselves, move. If too thick a layer of sediment is deposited before they can grow or reproduce through it, parts of the colony will die leaving behind fossils with a characteristically wrinkled ("elephant skin") and tubercular texture.

Some Ediacaran strata with the texture characteristics of microbial mats contain fossils, and Ediacaran fossils are almost always found in beds that contain these microbial mats. Although microbial mats were once widespread, the evolution of grazing organisms in the Cambrian vastly reduced their numbers. These communities are now limited to inhospitable refugia, such as the stromatolites found in Hamelin Pool Marine Nature Reserve in Shark Bay, Western Australia, where the salt levels can be twice those of the surrounding sea.

Fossilization

The preservation of these fossils is one of their great fascinations to science. As soft-bodied organisms, they would normally not fossilize and, unlike later soft-bodied fossil biota such as the Burgess Shale or Solnhofen Limestone, the Ediacaran biota is not found in a restricted environment subject to unusual local conditions: They were a global phenomenon. The processes that were operating must have been systemic and worldwide. There was something very different about the Ediacaran Period that permitted these delicate creatures to be left behind and it is thought the fossils were preserved by virtue of rapid covering by ash or sand, trapping them against the mud or microbial mats on which they lived. Their preservation was possibly enhanced by the high concentration of silica in the oceans before silica-secreting organisms such as sponges and diatoms became prevalent. Ash beds provide more detail and can readily be dated to the nearest million years or better using radiometric dating.
However, it is more common to find Ediacaran fossils under sandy beds deposited by storms or high-energy bottom-scraping ocean currents known as turbidites. Soft-bodied organisms today rarely fossilize during such events, but the presence of widespread microbial mats probably aided preservation by stabilising their impressions in the sediment below.

Scale of preservation
The rate of cementation of the overlying substrate relative to the rate of decomposition of the organism determines whether the top or bottom surface of an organism is preserved. Most disc-shaped fossils decomposed before the overlying sediment was cemented, whereupon ash or sand slumped in to fill the void, leaving a cast of the organism's underside.

Conversely, quilted fossils tended to decompose after the cementation of the overlying sediment; hence their upper surfaces are preserved. Their more resistant nature is reflected in the fact that, in rare occasions, quilted fossils are found within storm beds as the high-energy sedimentation did not destroy them as it would have the less-resistant discs. Further, in some cases, the bacterial precipitation of minerals formed a "death mask", ultimately leaving a positive, cast-like impression of the organism.

Morphology

The Ediacaran biota exhibited a vast range of morphological characteristics. Size ranged from millimetres to metres; complexity from "blob-like" to intricate; rigidity from sturdy and resistant to jelly-soft. Almost all forms of symmetry were present. These organisms differed from earlier fossils by displaying an organised, differentiated multicellular construction and centimetre-plus sizes.

These disparate morphologies can be broadly grouped into form taxa:

 "Embryos"  Recent discoveries of Precambrian multicellular life have been dominated by reports of embryos, particularly from the Doushantuo Formation in China. Some finds generated intense media excitement though some have claimed they are instead inorganic structures formed by the precipitation of minerals on the inside of a hole. Other "embryos" have been interpreted as the remains of the giant sulfur-reducing bacteria akin to Thiomargarita, a view that, while it had enjoyed a notable gain of supporters as of 2007, has since suffered following further research comparing the potential Doushantuo embryos' morphologies with those of Thiomargarita specimens, both living and in various stages of decay. A recent discovery of comparable Ediacaran fossil embryos from the Portfjeld Formation in Greenland has significantly expanded the paleogeograpical occurrence of Doushantuo-type fossil "embryos" with similar biotic forms now reported from differing paleolatitudes. 
 Microfossils dating from  – just 3 million years after the end of the Cryogenian glaciations – may represent embryonic 'resting stages' in the life cycle of the earliest known animals. An alternative proposal is that these structures represent adult stages of the multicellular organisms of this period. Microfossils of Caveasphaera are thought to foreshadow the evolutionary origin of animal-like embryology.

 Discs  Circular fossils, such as Ediacaria, Cyclomedusa and Rugoconites led to the initial identification of Ediacaran fossils as cnidaria, which include jellyfish and corals. Further examination has provided alternative interpretations of all disc-shaped fossils: not one is now confidently recognised as a jellyfish. Alternate explanations include holdfasts and protists; the patterns displayed where two meet have led to many 'individuals' being identified as microbial colonies, and yet others may represent scratch marks formed as stalked organisms spun around their holdfasts. Useful diagnostic characteristics are often lacking because only the underside of the organism is preserved by fossilisation.

 Bags  Fossils such as Pteridinium preserved within sediment layers resemble "mud-filled bags". The scientific community is a long way from reaching a consensus on their interpretation.

 Toroids  The fossil Vendoglossa tuberculata from the Nama Group, Namibia, has been interpreted as a dorso-ventrally compressed stem-group metazoan, with a large gut cavity and a transversely ridged ectoderm. The organism is in the shape of a flattened torus, with the long axis of its toroidal body running through the approximate center of the presumed gut cavity.

 Quilted organisms  The organisms considered in Seilacher's revised definition of the Vendobionta share a "quilted" appearance and resembled an inflatable mattress. Sometimes these quilts would be torn or ruptured prior to preservation: Such damaged specimens provide valuable clues in the reconstruction process. For example, the three (or more) petaloid fronds of Swartpuntia germsi could only be recognised in a posthumously damaged specimen – usually multiple fronds were hidden as burial squashed the organisms flat.

These organisms appear to form two groups: the fractal rangeomorphs and the simpler erniettomorphs. Including such fossils as the iconic Charnia and Swartpuntia, the group is both the most iconic of the Ediacaran biota and the most difficult to place within the existing tree of life. Lacking any mouth, gut, reproductive organs, or indeed any evidence of internal anatomy, their lifestyle was somewhat peculiar by modern standards; the most widely accepted hypothesis holds that they sucked nutrients out of the surrounding seawater by osmotrophy or osmosis. However, others argue against this.

 Non-Vendobionts  Some Ediacaran organisms have more complex details preserved, which has allowed them to be interpreted as possible early forms of living phyla excluding them from some definitions of the Ediacaran biota.

 The earliest such fossil is the reputed bilaterian Vernanimalcula claimed by some, however, to represent the infilling of an egg-sac or acritarch. In 2020, Ikaria wariootia was claimed to represent one of the oldest organisms with anterior and posterior differentiation. Later examples are almost universally accepted as bilaterians and include the mollusc-like Kimberella, Spriggina (pictured) and the shield-shaped Parvancorina whose affinities are currently debated.

 A suite of fossils known as the small shelly fossils are represented in the Ediacaran, most famously by Cloudina a shelly tube-like fossil that often shows evidence of predatory boring, suggesting that, while predation may not have been common in the Ediacaran Period, it was at least present.

 Organic microfossils known as small carbonaceous fossils are also found in Ediacaran sediments, including the spiral-shaped Cochleatina which has been found to span the Ediacaran–Cambrian boundary.

 Representatives of modern taxa existed in the Ediacaran, some of which are recognisable today. Sponges, red and green algæ, protists and bacteria are all easily recognisable with some pre-dating the Ediacaran by nearly three billion years. Possible arthropods have also been described.

 Fossils of the hard-shelled foraminifera Platysolenites are known from the latest Ediacaran of western Siberia, coexisting with Cloudina and Namacalathus.

 Filaments
 Filament-shaped structures in Precambrian fossils have been observed on many occasions. Frondose fossils in Newfoundland have been observed to have developed filamentous bedding planes, inferred to be stolonic outgrowths. A study of Brazilian Ediacaran fossils found filamentous microfossils, suggested to be eukaryotes or large sulfur-oxidizing-bacteria (SOBs). Fungus-like filaments found in the Doushantuo Formation have been interpreted as eukaryotes and possibly fungi, providing possible evidence for the evolution and terrestrialization of fungi ~635 Ma.

 Trace fossils  With the exception of some very simple vertical burrows the only Ediacaran burrows are horizontal, lying on or just below the surface of the seafloor. Such burrows have been taken to imply the presence of motile organisms with heads, which would probably have had a bilateral symmetry. This could place them in the bilateral clade of animals but they could also have been made by simpler organisms feeding as they slowly rolled along the sea floor. Putative "burrows" dating as far back as  may have been made by animals that fed on the undersides of microbial mats, which would have shielded them from a chemically unpleasant ocean; however their uneven width and tapering ends make a biological origin so difficult to defend that even the original proponent no longer believes they are authentic.

 The burrows observed imply simple behaviour, and the complex efficient feeding traces common from the start of the Cambrian are absent. Some Ediacaran fossils, especially discs, have been interpreted tentatively as trace fossils but this hypothesis has not gained widespread acceptance. As well as burrows, some trace fossils have been found directly associated with an Ediacaran fossil. Yorgia and Dickinsonia are often found at the end of long pathways of trace fossils matching their shape; these fossils are thought to be associated with ciliary feeding but the precise method of formation of these disconnected and overlapping fossils largely remains a mystery. The potential mollusc Kimberella is associated with scratch marks, perhaps formed by a radula.

Classification and interpretation
Classification of the Ediacarans is difficult, and hence a variety of theories exist as to their placement on the tree of life.

Martin Glaessner proposed in The Dawn of Animal Life (1984) that the Ediacaran biota were recognizable crown group members of modern phyla, but were unfamiliar because they had yet to evolve the characteristic features we use in modern classification.

In 1998 Mark McMenamin claimed Ediacarans did not possess an embryonic stage, and thus could not be animals. He believed that they independently evolved a nervous system and brains, meaning that "the path toward intelligent life was embarked upon more than once on this planet".

In 2018 analysis of ancient sterols was taken as evidence that one of the period's most-prominent and iconic fossils, Dickinsonia, was an early animal.

Cnidarians

Since the most primitive eumetazoans—multi-cellular animals with tissues—are cnidarians, and the first recognized Ediacaran fossil Charnia looks very much like a sea pen, the first attempt to categorise these fossils designated them as jellyfish and sea pens. However, more recent discoveries have established that many of the circular forms formerly considered "cnidarian medusa" are actually holdfasts – sand-filled vesicles occurring at the base of the stem of upright frond-like Ediacarans. A notable example is the form known as Charniodiscus, a circular impression later found to be attached to the long 'stem' of a frond-like organism that now bears the name.

The link between certain frond-like Ediacarans and sea pens has been thrown into doubt by multiple lines of evidence; chiefly the derived nature of the most frond-like pennatulacean octocorals, their absence from the fossil record before the Tertiary, and the apparent cohesion between segments in Ediacaran frond-like organisms. Some researchers have suggested that an analysis of "growth poles" discredits the pennatulacean nature of Ediacaran fronds.

This leaves the Canadian polyp Haootia, the British Auroralumina, the staurozoan Corumbella, and the early conulariid Paraconularia ediacara as the only recognized cnidarian body fossils from the Ediacaran, both being sessile forms showing a quadrilateral symmetry of the body. So while this shows that Cnidarians were already well established in the Ediacaran period, the question remains if there were only sessile polyps or that a medusal stage had also developed.

Protozoans

Adolf Seilacher has suggested the Ediacaran sees animals usurping giant protists as the dominant life form. The modern xenophyophores are giant single-celled protozoans found throughout the world's oceans, largely on the abyssal plain. A recent genetic study suggested that the xenophyophores are a specialised group of Foraminifera.

New phylum
Seilacher has suggested that the Ediacaran organisms represented a unique and extinct grouping of related forms descended from a common ancestor (clade) and created the kingdom Vendozoa, named after the now-obsolete Vendian era. He later excluded fossils identified as metazoans and relaunched the phylum "Vendobionta".

He described the Vendobionta as 'quilted' cnidarians lacking stinging cells. This absence precludes the current cnidarian method of feeding, so Seilacher suggested that the organisms may have survived by symbiosis with photosynthetic or chemoautotrophic organisms. Mark McMenamin saw such feeding strategies as characteristic for the entire biota, and referred to the marine biota of this period as a "Garden of Ediacara".

Lichen hypothesis

Greg Retallack has proposed that Ediacaran organisms were lichens. He argues that thin sections of Ediacaran fossils show lichen-like compartments and hypha-like wisps of ferruginized clay, and that Ediacaran fossils have been found in strata that he interprets as desert soils.

The suggestion has been disputed by other scientists; some have described the evidence as ambiguous and unconvincing, for instance noting that Dickinsonia fossils have been found on rippled surfaces (suggesting a marine environment), while trace fossils like Radulichnus could not have been caused by needle ice as Retallack has proposed. Ben Waggoner notes that the suggestion would place the root of the Cnidaria back from around 900 mya to between 1500 mya and 2000 mya, contradicting much other evidence. Matthew Nelsen, examining phylogenies of ascomycete fungi and chlorophyte algae (components of lichens), calibrated for time, finds no support for the hypothesis that lichens predated the vascular plants.

Other interpretations
Several classifications have been used to accommodate the Ediacaran biota at some point, from algae, to protozoans, to fungi to bacterial or microbial colonies, to hypothetical intermediates between plants and animals.

A new extant genus discovered in 2014, Dendrogramma, which at the time of discovery appeared to be a basal metazoan but of unknown taxonomic placement, had been noted to have similarities with the Ediacaran fauna. It has since been found to be a siphonophore, possibly even sections of a more complex species, though this in turn has raised suspicions for a similar status for at least some Ediacaran organisms.

Origin
It took almost 4 billion years from the formation of the Earth for the Ediacaran fossils to first appear, 655 million years ago.

It could be that no special explanation is required: the slow process of evolution simply required 4 billion years to accumulate the necessary adaptations.

The alternative train of thought is that it was simply not advantageous to be large until the appearance of the Ediacarans: the environment favoured the small over the large. Examples of such scenarios today include plankton, whose small size allows them to reproduce rapidly to take advantage of ephemerally abundant nutrients in algal blooms. But for large size never to be favourable, the environment would have to be very different indeed.

A primary size-limiting factor is the amount of atmospheric oxygen. Without a complex circulatory system, low concentrations of oxygen cannot reach the centre of an organism quickly enough to supply its metabolic demand.

On the early Earth, reactive elements, such as iron and uranium, existed in a reduced form that would react with any free oxygen produced by photosynthesising organisms. Oxygen would not be able to build up in the atmosphere until all the iron had rusted (producing banded iron formations), and all the other reactive elements had been oxidised. Donald Canfield detected records of the first significant quantities of atmospheric oxygen just before the first Ediacaran fossils appeared – and the presence of atmospheric oxygen was soon heralded as a possible trigger for the Ediacaran radiation. Oxygen seems to have accumulated in two pulses; the rise of small, sessile (stationary) organisms seems to correlate with an early oxygenation event, with larger and mobile organisms appearing around the second pulse of oxygenation. However, the assumptions underlying the reconstruction of atmospheric composition have attracted some criticism, with widespread anoxia having little effect on life where it occurs in the Early Cambrian and the Cretaceous.

Periods of intense cold have also been suggested as a barrier to the evolution of multicellular life.
The earliest known embryos, from China's Doushantuo Formation, appear just a million years after the Earth emerged from a global glaciation, suggesting that ice cover and cold oceans may have prevented the emergence of multicellular life. Potentially, complex life may have evolved before these glaciations, and been wiped out. However, the diversity of life in modern Antarctica has sparked disagreement over whether cold temperatures increase or decrease the rate of evolution.

They found that, while the White Sea assemblage had the most species, there was no significant difference in disparity between the three groups, and concluded that before the beginning of the Avalon timespan these organisms must have gone through their own evolutionary "explosion", which may have been similar to the famous Cambrian explosion.

Preservation bias
The paucity of Ediacaran fossils after the Cambrian could simply be due to conditions that no longer favoured the fossilisation of Ediacaran organisms, which may have continued to thrive unpreserved. However, if they were common, more than the occasional specimen might be expected in exceptionally preserved fossil assemblages (Konservat-Lagerstätten) such as the Burgess Shale and Chengjiang. Although no reports of Ediacara-type organisms in the Cambrian period are widely accepted at present, a few disputed reports have been made, as well as unpublished observations of 'vendobiont' fossils from 535 Ma Orsten-type deposits in China.

Predation and grazing

It is suggested that by the Early Cambrian, organisms higher in the food chain caused the microbial mats to largely disappear. If these grazers first appeared as the Ediacaran biota started to decline, then it may suggest that they destabilised the microbial substrate, leading to displacement or detachment of the biota; or that the destruction of the mat destabilised the ecosystem, causing extinctions.

Alternatively, skeletonised animals could have fed directly on the relatively undefended Ediacaran biota.
However, if the interpretation of the Ediacaran age Kimberella as a grazer is correct then this suggests that the biota had already had limited exposure to "predation".

Little evidence has been identified for any trace fossils in the Ediacaran Period, which could speak against the active grazing theory. Further, the onset of the Cambrian Period is defined by the appearance of a worldwide trace fossil assemblage, quite distinct from the activity-barren Ediacaran Period.

Competition

It is possible that increased competition due to the evolution of key innovations among other groups, perhaps as a response to predation, drove the Ediacaran biota from their niches.
However, this argument has not successfully explained similar phenomena. For instance, the bivalve molluscs' "competitive exclusion" of brachiopods was eventually deemed to be a coincidental result of two unrelated trends.

Change in environmental conditions
While it is difficult to infer the effect of changing planetary conditions on organisms, communities, and ecosystems, great changes were happening at the end of the Precambrian and the start of the Early Cambrian. The breakup of the supercontinents, rising sea levels (creating shallow, "life-friendly" seas), a nutrient crisis, fluctuations in atmospheric composition, including oxygen and carbon dioxide levels, and changes in ocean chemistry (promoting biomineralisation) could all have played a part.

Assemblages
Ediacaran-type fossils are recognised globally in 25 localities and a variety of depositional conditions, and are commonly grouped into three main types, known as assemblages and named after typical localities. Each assemblage tends to occupy its own region of morphospace, and after an initial burst of diversification changes little for the rest of its existence.

Avalon-type assemblage
The Avalon-type assemblage is defined at Mistaken Point in Canada, the oldest locality with a large quantity of Ediacaran fossils.
The assemblage is easily dated because it contains many fine ash-beds, which are a good source of zircons used in the uranium-lead method of radiometric dating. These fine-grained ash beds also preserve exquisite detail. Constituents of this biota appear to survive through until the extinction of all Ediacarans at the base of the Cambrian.

One interpretation of the biota is as deep-sea-dwelling rangeomorphs such as Charnia, all of which share a fractal growth pattern. They were probably preserved in situ (without post-mortem transportation), although this point is not universally accepted. The assemblage, while less diverse than the Ediacara- or Nama-types, resembles Carboniferous suspension-feeding communities, which may suggest filter feeding – by most interpretations, the assemblage is found in water too deep for photosynthesis. The low diversity may reflect the depth of water – which would restrict speciation opportunities – or it may just be too young for a rich biota to have evolved. Opinion is currently divided between these conflicting hypotheses.

Ediacara-type assemblage
The Ediacara-type assemblage is named after Australia's Ediacara Hills, and consists of fossils preserved in facies of coastal lagoons and rivers. They are typically found in red gypsiferous and calcareous paleosols formed on loess and flood deposits in an arid cool temperate paleoclimate. Most fossils are preserved as imprints in microbial earths, but a few are preserved within sandy units.

Nama-type assemblage
The Nama assemblage is best represented in Namibia. Three-dimensional preservation is most common, with organisms preserved in sandy beds containing internal bedding. Dima Grazhdankin believes that these fossils represent burrowing organisms, while Guy Narbonne maintains they were surface dwellers. These beds are sandwiched between units comprising interbedded sandstones, siltstones and shales – with microbial mats, where present, usually containing the fossils. The environment is interpreted as sand bars formed at the mouth of a delta's distributaries. Mattress-like vendobionts (Ernietta, Pteridinium, Rangea) in these sandstones form a very different assemblage from vermiform fossils (Cloudina, Namacalathus) of Ediacaran "wormworld" in marine dolomite of Namibia.

Significance of assemblages
In the White Sea region of Russia, all three assemblage types have been found in close proximity. This, and the faunas' considerable temporal overlap, makes it unlikely that they represent evolutionary stages or temporally distinct communities. Since they are globally distributed – described on all continents except Antarctica – geographical boundaries do not appear to be a factor; the same fossils are found at all palaeolatitudes (the latitude where the fossil was created, accounting for continental drift) and in separate sedimentary basins.

It is most likely that the three assemblages mark organisms adapted to survival in different environments, and that any apparent patterns in diversity or age are in fact an artefact of the few samples that have been discovered – the timeline (right) demonstrates the paucity of Ediacaran fossil-bearing assemblages. An analysis of one of the White Sea fossil beds, where the layers cycle from continental seabed to inter-tidal to estuarine and back again a few times, found that a specific set of Ediacaran organisms was associated with each environment.

As the Ediacaran biota represent an early stage in multicellular life's history, it is unsurprising that not all possible modes of life are occupied.
It has been estimated that of 92 potentially possible modes of life – combinations of feeding style, tiering and motility — no more than a dozen are occupied by the end of the Ediacaran. Just four are represented in the Avalon assemblage. The lack of large-scale predation and vertical burrowing are perhaps the most significant factors limiting the ecological diversity; the emergence of these during the Early Cambrian allowed the number of lifestyles occupied to rise to 30.

See also

 Cambrian explosion
 Large ornamented Ediacaran microfossil
 List of Ediacaran genera
 Abiogenesis
 Francevillian biota
 Huainan biota
 Doushantuo Formation

Notes

References

Further reading
  — Excellent further reading for the keen – includes many interesting chapters with macroevolutionary theme.
  — A popular science account of these fossils, with a particular focus on the Namibian fossils.

External links
  — Ediacaran biota review article, with nice illustrations
  — Thorough, though slightly out-of-date, description 
 {{cite web |title=Database of Ediacaran biota |date=July 2010 |website=complex-life.org |url=http://www.complex-life.org/database |url-status=dead  |archive-url=https://web.archive.org/web/20110725191154/http://www.complex-life.org/database — compilation up to 7/2010
  
  
 
  — ABC TV show on Ediacaran fossils at Nilpena

 , 2009, radio program

 
Biota
Proterozoic life